The Fresh Beat Band (originally known as The JumpArounds) is an American live action musical children's television series created by Scott Kraft and Nadine van der Velde for Nickelodeon. The show stars the "Fresh Beats" (Kiki, Shout, Marina, and Twist), described as four best friends in a silly and jolly band who graduate together from music school and are determined to follow their dreams. The series premiered on Nickelodeon in the United States on August 24, 2009. In December 2013, it was announced that the series would not be renewed for a fourth season.

In 2015, an animated television series, Fresh Beat Band of Spies, premiered on Nickelodeon. All four members of the band lend their voices to their respective characters in the spin-off.

The series returned on Nick Jr. on Pluto TV on May 1, 2019.

Premise 
All episodes follow the same basic structure:
 Each episode begins with a song that foreshadows a problem that the band will solve.
 The band works together to solve the problem.
 When the problem is solved they perform a song with the problem and solution incorporated into the lyrics.
 Each episode concludes with a version of The Fresh Beat Band's closing song, "Great Day".
 The main characters dance to choreography by Mandy Moore; Sean Cheesman; Chuck Maldonado; Scotty Nguyen; Dreya Weber; Mary Ann Kellogg; Nakul Mahajan; Mihran Kirakosian; Susan Austin, and Fred Tallaksen.
Also, they appeared in the Nickelodeon Mega Music Fest.

Characters

Main

Recurring 
 Harper the Pizza Maker – owner of the Pizza Café, played by Shane Blades
 Melody the Smoothie Maker – owner of the Groovy Smoothie Shop, played by Dioni Michelle Collins
 Ms. Piccolo the Teacher – music school teacher, played by Monica Lee Gradischek
 Reed the Guitar Player – occasional guitar player and supplier of the Fresh Beats' instruments, played by Hadley Fraser (season 1) and Patrick Levis (season 2–3)

There are also four children known as "The Junior Beats" who are essentially the child equivalent of their grown-up counterparts. They sing, dance, and dress as a corresponding character.

Episodes 

During the buildup to the show's debut, the band was initially advertised as The JumpArounds. Commercials promoting the band under that name were in heavy rotation on Nickelodeon prior to the series debut. The change occurred approximately in mid July 2009. The name was revealed on the Nick Jr. website, then made its debut on television.

Nominations and awards 
 26th Annual Imagen Awards Nomination for Best Young Actress/Television : Yvette Gonzalez-Nacer in The Fresh Beat Band
 Parents Choice 2011 Award:  The Fresh Beat Band – Fun Stuff (Ages: 2 – 5 years)

Music 
The Fresh Beat Band: Music From the Hit TV Show was released on January 31, 2012. The album sold 189,000 copies in the US in 2012. A second collection, Vol 2.0: More Music From The Hit TV Show was released on October 9, 2012.

Singles 
Four singles were released to iTunes; "Great Day" was released on February 2, 2010, "Here We Go" was released on June 28, 2011, "A Friend Like You" was released on September 13, 2011, and "Just Like a Rockstar" was released on November 29, 2011.

Track list

Channel 
On November 8, 2012, it announced that the all new Fresh Beat Band channel has launched and its now available on Dish Network channel 601 and VOD on demand. The channel has UPSR, PT3 and SPM subjects plus The Fresh Beat Band music videos and episodes, broadcast 24 hours a day, 7 days a week.

Home releases

Retail releases

Manufacture on-demand releases

Episodes on Nick Jr. compilation DVDs

Episodes on Nick Jr. iTunes compilations

Critical reception
Drew Magary of Deadspin describes the show as "pure evil, as much as an innocent and friendly show about good friends can be pure evil".

Mobile streaming
On November 7, 2018, the first season of the series was added to the Noggin SVOD service, making it the first time in two years that the show has been broadcast on the Viacom cable and mobile networks. In January 2021, the third season was added to Paramount+ (at the time CBS All Access).

References

2000s American children's comedy television series
2000s American musical comedy television series
2000s Nickelodeon original programming
2000s preschool education television series
2009 American television series debuts
2010s American children's comedy television series
2010s American musical comedy television series
2010s Nickelodeon original programming
2010s preschool education television series
2013 American television series endings
American children's musical television series
American preschool education television series
Nick Jr. original programming
Treehouse TV original programming
English-language television shows